Hardinxveld-Giessendam is a railway station for Hardinxveld-Giessendam in the province of South Holland in the Netherlands. It is located on the MerwedeLingelijn, between Dordrecht and Geldermalsen. Train services are operated by Qbuzz.

History
The station was opened as the Giessendam-Oudekerk railway station on 16 July 1885. To the east, outside the two villages, was the Hardinxveld-Giessendam railway station. When the latter was closed down on 15 May 1927, the Giessendam-Oudekerk station was renamed "Giessendam-Neder Hardinxveld". The station building was severely damaged during World War II, and was demolished in 1945. On 2 June 1957, the name of the station was changed to its current name, and a year later a new station building was constructed. The building is now used as a restaurant.

Train services

Bus services

External links
Stationsweb.nl 
Arriva website 
Dutch Public Transport journey planner 

Railway stations in South Holland
Railway stations opened in 1885
Railway stations on the Merwede-Lingelijn
Hardinxveld-Giessendam